JEI University (hangul: 인천재능대학교, hanja: 仁川才能大學校) is a private college located in Donggu, Incheon Metropolitan City.

It was established in December, 1970 as a professional school of Daehun Electronics College of Technology. In 1979, it was reorganized as Daehun College of Technology and changed its name to Daehun Junior College in 1993.

In February 1997, Park Sung-hoon, CEO of JEI Corporation took office as Chairman. In 1998, Daehun Junior College changed its name to JEI College and was renamed Incheon JEI University .

See also
List of universities and colleges in South Korea

References

External links
 
 Official website

Universities and colleges in Incheon
1970 establishments in South Korea
Universities and colleges in South Korea
Dong District, Incheon